Md Shakhawat Hossain Nirab who is known by his stage name as Nirab, is a Bangladeshi film actor and model. Nirab started his career by modeling. He acted in several television commercials, dramas and later he started working in films. He made his debut with the 2009 film Mon Jekhane Hridoy Sekhane opposite Apu Biswas and Shakib Khan. He debuted in the 2015 Malaysian movie Banglasia which is being written and directed by Namewee and produced by Fred Chong and 2017 Bollywood movie Sheitaan which is being written and produced by film maker Faisal Saif and directed by Sameer Khan. Nirab married Riddhi on 26 December 2014.

Filmography

Television

Music video

References

External links
 
 

Living people
People from Dhaka
Bangladeshi male film actors
Bangladeshi male television actors
Bengali male actors
1983 births